Levonantradol (CP 50,556-1) is a synthetic cannabinoid analog of dronabinol (Marinol) developed by Pfizer in the 1980s. It is around 30x more potent than THC, and exhibits antiemetic and analgesic effects via activation of CB1 and CB2 cannabinoid receptors. Levonantradol is not currently used in medicine as dronabinol or nabilone are felt to be more useful for most conditions, however it is widely used in research into the potential therapeutic applications of cannabinoids.

Pharmacodynamics
Levonantradol is a full CB1 receptor agonist. Cannabinoid receptors belong to the superfamily of G-protein coupled receptors (GPCRs), and endogenous cannabinoids naturally activate GPCRs. GPCRs modulate the inhibition of adenylyl cyclase and accumulation of the second messenger, cyclic adenosine monophosphate (cAMP). The CB1 receptor is the most common GPCR in the central nervous system. The activation of CB1Rs decrease calcium conductance and increase potassium conductance in the brain. CB signaling naturally modulates synaptic transmission and mediates psychoactivity, and synthetic cannabinoids mimic these same actions. Although the efficacy of Levonantradol is dependent on the level of GCPR activity, Full agonists like Levonantradol have the ability to activate GPCRs and convert Gα into a high affinity state for GTP or low affinity state for GDP. Previous studies suggest that Levonantradol has a higher binding affinity and efficacy than other similar synthetic cannabinoids (e.g. Δ9-THC).

Pharmacokinetics
Although Levonantradol has been extensively tested on animals including cats, rodents, and non-human primates. It has also been tested among cancer patient populations in clinical trials. Levonantradol is most commonly administered intramuscularly (I.M.), however it can also be administered orally. The dosage can range from 0.25 mg-3.0 mg every 2–4 hours, and the half-life is 1–2 hours. In order to administer Levonantradol intramuscularly, the drug must be dissolved in 5% ethanol, 5% emulphur, and 90% sterile saline. Synthetic cannabinoids like Levonantradol readily cross the blood–brain barrier because they are highly lipophilic and have low molecular weights. Levonantradol’s bioavailability is variable due to the first pass metabolism.

Treatment
Levonantradol has been clinically tested in cancer patients for its  pain relief and antiemetic benefits. Cancer patients that endure chemotherapy often develop intense nausea, and Levonantradol has been tested to reduce these emetic symptoms. It is often used instead of THC because it has a higher efficacy. Levonantradol also acts on pain pathways in the central nervous system, which enables the drug to alleviate pain. Studies have shown an absence of emetic side effects within the half-life of the Levonantradol administered. Other studies suggest that cannabinoid agonists can synergize opioid anti-nociception. Cannabinoid receptors are located in nociceptive pathways, and CBs can promote signal transduction in TRP channels. Although Levonantradol relieves nociceptive and postoperative pain, decreases nausea, and improves spasticity in addition to being more effective than placebos, it has yet to be approved as legal medicine. Researchers have concluded that Levonantradol is no more effective than Codeine, which is why they do not recommend expansion into clinical practice.

Side effects
The side effects for Levonantradol include ptosis, sedation, and ataxia in non-human primates. In rodents, the symptoms include dysphoria, memory impairment, motor incoordination, reduced concentration, and disorientation. Levonantradol also decreases startle response. In humans, side effects include dry mouth, drowsiness, dizziness, altered perception, mild sedation, and lack of concentration. It can cause an increase in heart rate and decrease in blood pressure. Euphoric symptoms rarely occurred in subjects.

Synthesis

Dane salt formation between 3,5-dimethoxyaniline and ethyl acetoacetate followed by borohydrate reduction gives synthon 1. The amino group is protected by rxn with ethyl chloroformate, the ester group is saponified, and then cyclodehydration with polyphosphoric acid leads to the dihydroquinoline ring system (2). Deblocking with HBr is followed by etherification of the nonchelated phenolic hydroxyl gives 3. Treatment with NaH and ethyl formate results in both N-formylation and C-formylation of the active methylene to give 4. Michael addition of methyl vinyl ketone (MVP) followed by successive base treatments to remove the activating C-formyl group and then to complete the Robinson annulation to give 5. Lithium in liquid ammonia reduces the olefinic linkage and successive acetylation and sodium borohydrate reductions complete the synthesis of nantradol (6).

See also 
 CP 47,497

Notes

References 

 
 
 
 

Acetate esters
Cannabinoids
Pfizer brands
Phenanthridines
Phenol ethers
CB1 receptor agonists